Donika Grajqevci (born 14 November 2002) is a Kosovan footballer who plays as a midfielder for
2. Frauen-Bundesliga club FC Carl Zeiss Jena and the Kosovo national team.

See also
List of Kosovo women's international footballers

Notes

References

2002 births
Living people

Kosovan women's footballers
Women's association football midfielders
Kosovo women's international footballers
German women's footballers
FF USV Jena players
Frauen-Bundesliga players
2. Frauen-Bundesliga players
German people of Kosovan descent